= Rileys Run =

Stream in Ohio, U.S.

Coordinates: 39°31′25″N 84°10′59″W

Rileys Run is a stream in the U.S. state of Ohio.
